SBN can mean:

 Naval Aircraft Factory SBN, a scout/torpedo bomber from the mid-1930s
 Sehar Broadcasting Network, a television channel in Pakistan
 Servizio bibliotecario nazionale, the National Library Service of Italy
 Small Business Network, by PCM, Inc.
 Society for Behavioral Neuroendocrinology
 Sonlife Broadcasting Network of the Jimmy Swaggart Ministries
 South Bend International Airport, IATA code
 Southern Broadcasting Network, in the Philippines
 Standard Beatbox Notation
 Standard Book Numbering, which developed into ISBN
 Strontium barium niobate
 Former Student Broadcast Network, UK
 Subtract and branch if negative, computer opcode
 Supervision Broadcasting Network, Mongolia